The President's Colour Award is the highest honour that can be bestowed upon any military unit of India. It is also known as ′Nishaan′ which is an emblem that is worn by all unit officers on the left-hand sleeve of their uniform.

The presentation of the award or standards by the Supreme Commander of the Armed Forces of India (President of India) is an acknowledgement of the unit's meritorious service. While the practice of carrying the Colour into battle has stopped, the tradition of receiving, holding and parading the Colour continues even today in the Armed forces. To this day, the President's Colours is very significant, if the unit lose their colours, it is a disgrace for that unit and, if the unit captured the enemy's colours then it is a great honour for that unit.

The 'Standards' are awarded to Heavy Cavalry and the 'Guidons' are awarded to Light Cavalry.

History

In military organizations, the practice of carrying colours, standards or guidons, both to act as a rallying point for troops and to mark the location of the commander, is thought to have originated in Egypt some about 5,000 years ago.

In Indian context, 'Colours or Standards' are also known as 'Dhwajs or Patakas'. The concept of dhwajs has also roots in the 'Vedas' and 'Puranas'. The armies of the king or emperor were also carries the 'Dhwajs'. If the army lost its dhwaj to the hands of enemy, then it means disgrace and if the army capture the dhwaj of the enemy, then it means an honour. If the army accept the dhwajs of the King/Emperor, then it means that the army has accepted the supremacy of that King/Emperor.

In regiments of infantry of British Army and other armies of commonwealth nations, each battalion carries two colours, which collectively are called as stand. These are large flags 36in × 45in and mounted on a pike which is 8ft7½ in long; the king's/queen's version is usually the version of country's national flag, often trimmed with gold fabric, and with the regiment's insignia placed in the centre. The Regimental colour is a flag of a single colour, usually the colour of the uniform facing (collar/lapels/cuffs) of the regiment, again often trimmed and with the insignia in the centre. Most of the regiments that are designated as 'royal' regiments (that is either have the word 'Royal' or have the sponsorship of a royal personage in their name) have a navy blue colour Regimental Colour. Irish Regiments, today the Royal Irish Regiment, have a dark green Regimental Colour.

With East India Company coming under the control of the English, the regiments in India started as carrying colours of the British Crown. Later, it became the President's Colours.

India became a republic on 26 January 1950. One day earlier on 25 January, all 33 of the King's Colours which had been presented to the Royal Indian Army, Royal Indian Navy, Royal Indian Air Force and their respective commands were "laid up" at the Indian Military Academy, Dehradun. From, 26 January 1950 onwards, the use of the prefix 'Royal' was discontinued. Later, they became the colours of the President of Republic of India.

On 27 February 1951, the Commander-in-Chief of the Indian Navy, Vice Admiral Sir Edward Parry, wrote to the defence minister Baldev Singh: "As you know that India became a Republic, Naval Custom was to parade the King's Colours ashore on the special ceremonial occasions. On and after 26 January 1950, however this practice was ceased and the ordinary Naval Ensign has been paraded instead. It would be a privilege of which the service would be extremely proud if the President of India would honour the Indian Navy by presenting to it a special flag which would be paraded on important occasions in the same manner as the King's Colours used to be."

Following the British tradition of the Navy being the senior of the three branches Armed Forces, the Indian Navy was the first to presented with the President's Colours on 27 May 1951. In the years that followed, as the Navy grew in size and the function, President's Colours were presented to the Naval Commands and the Fleets.

The President's Colours/Standard/Guidon is one of the greatest honours bestowed upon in recognition of exceptional service rendered by it to the nation, both during war and peace.

Design of the Colour

Army Unit Presidential Colour 
The President's Colours of Indian Army infantry battalions (both regular line and rifle and scout infantry) follow the format of the line infantry regimental colours of the armies of the Commonwealth (and the King's/Queen's Colours of the Foot Guards of the British Army, in the case of the Brigade of the Guards). Each Colour is gold fringed and is brought out on major ceremonies. In the center, the heraldic badge and distinctive unit insignia of the reporting regiment is stationed, surrounded by wreaths in which the battalion motto can be seen. On the sides of the colour, which is in the facing colour of the regiment, are the recognized battle honours won by the battalion and the whole of the regiment. Some battle honours of the regiments of line, light and rifle infantry, granted prior to independence to units for battles or campaigns in India against the local rulers or nationalist forces, have been declared as 'repugnant' and are not celebrated or held in esteem, and as in the case of the President's Colours, are not displayed. The recognized battle honours are displayed on gold scrolls that surround the unit badge. Unlike the British Army, which does not have colours for the light infantry and rifle regiments, the Indian Army also has President's Colours present in some of these units (following the Russian precedent adopted after the 1971 Bangladesh Liberation War), with the first light infantry battalion colour being presented in 1968. These colours follow a similar design to that of the line infantry. The regimental centre colour, regardless of regiment, follows the same design as the battalion colour but with the heraldic arms of the regiment, and carries all the recognized battle honors of that regiment and the regimental motto instead of the battalion's.

The same design of colours is used by the combat and service support formations of the Army with the service or unit badge, motto and the battle honours.

Army Unit President's Standard/Guidon 
The President's Standards and Guidons of Indian Army armoured and cavalry formations of the Indian Army Armoured Corps, smaller than the colours of the Infantry, have a similar design. All have gold fringe surrounding them, and the unit badge and its motto at the centre of it, surrounded by the recognized battle honors of the unit, all in the facing colour of the unit. The same case for repugnant honours goes for all of these formations of the Armoured Corps. The Standard of the Armoured Corps Centre carries all the Armoured Corps' recognized battle honours.

Units awarded the President's Standard have a design similar to the heavy cavalry regiments of the Commonwealth. Units however granted with the President's Guidon carry a similar design to those of the light cavalry regimental guidons, which are swallow-tailed.

Navy President's Colour 

It was the Indian Navy that was the first branch of the Armed Forces to receive the President's Colour in May 1951, one year after India became a republic of the Commonwealth. This colour, the President's Colour of the Navy, is the basis of the President's colours of all commands and services of the Navy. It is also awarded to ground naval bases and, as the President's Standard, to all naval combat and service support formations. 

Similar to the case of the Royal Navy, all colours share the identical design of the President's Colour, which in turn, is based on the former design of the Indian Naval Ensign. Unlike the RN Ensign the old design was unique that it has a golden elephant, symbol of the nation, on the bottom left side of the colour. It as always been in white and fringed in gold, with the national flag on the canton with the St. George's Cross, symbolizing the roots of the Navy in the Royal Indian Marine, with the State Emblem of India at the center, in gold, under which, written in Devanagari script, is the national motto Satyameva Jayate (Truth Alone Triumphs). There are no battle honours in the President's Colours unlike those in the other services.

In 2022 a new design of the President's Colours and Standards for the Navy and all naval commands, services and bases and formations was released to replace the old design. It retains much the design of the 2001-04 ensign and the gold fringe, but instead of the arms of that emblem, its feature on the fly is a octagonal navy blue shield - the official new heraldic emblem of the force - based on Chhatrapati Shivaji Maharaj's's royal seal surrounding the heraldic arms in gold, which also corrects a long omission from that ensign as well - the addition of, in Devanagari, the official motto of the Navy - May the Lord of Waters Be Auspicious Unto Us (Shaṁ No Varunaḥ). The shield is also gold fringed with two gold borders. The octagon represents the Navy's missions of national maritime defense and its multi-directional reach. The new design of the arms is the State Emblem atop a clear anchor in gold. Atop the emblem is the State Emblem and the national motto from the old design.

Air Force President's Colour/Standard 

All Indian Air Force air combat and combat support formations carry the President's Standard, which is in sky blue with the squadron or helicopter unit heraldic arms with the recognized battle honours given to these formations similar to those of the Army. Since it was established in 1932, there are no repugnant battle honours in these Standards, as the battle honours for these formations date beginning to the Second World War, the force's baptism of fire, and onwards.

The President's Colour is carried by Indian Air Force service support, education and training institutions and it uses the same design as in the President's Standard. It is also carried by air base and air station personnel and carries the same battle honours.

The Air Force itself has its own President's Colour - a gold fringed version of the official service ensign with the gold elephant on top of the air force roundel.

The ceremony of presentation of colours

The formation for the ceremonial parade is a battalion-sized (100–500 soldiers) formation of military units of an armed forces formation (from either the navy, army and air force) or a law enforcement formation. Four to eight companies is the usual size of the parade and a military band combined with a pipe band providing the ceremonial music is present. The parade commander, the Field Officer holding the rank of a major or lieutenant colonel (commander or lieutenant commander in the navy, wing commander or squadron leader in the air force), takes his place in the center of the parade field, assisted by the Second-in-Command and the Parade Adjutant. All wear full dress uniform.

The President of India, the ceremony's guest of honour, arrives as the parade renders a full National Salute as the National Anthem Jana Gana Mana is played by the band and a 21-gun salute is fired (occasionally by the Indian Army Regiment of Artillery). After the anthem, the parade is inspected, as the band plays a slow march. If any old colours are present, they are marched out of the field for the final time as the new colours of the unit are about to replace these colours, and the parade renders a salute as the audience in the grandstand stands in respect and the President, together with the service chiefs, salutes it one final time.

Then, the Sarvadharma Samaroh begins. A drum altar had been formed by members of the band and the unit pipe band, and the new colour, which had already been removed of its cloth case, is brought there by the quartermaster of the unit. Afterwards, the Nishaan is consecrated by military chaplains of religions represented in the Armed Forces (Hinduism, Sikhism, Christianity and Islam). Then, the President's Colour is received by an officer designated as Nishan Adhikari on behalf of the military or police unit (in question) during the parade by the President or any other designated person on behalf of him or her, who serves as the unit ensign (holding rank of lieutenant in the Army, sublieutenant in the Navy and flying officer in the Air Force). Then, the ceremony ends with the National Anthem as the colour is marched into the parade formation, which salutes the colour.  The drummers then return to their places in the band. Following that, the battalion marches past in quick time with the new colours before returning to their places. (If in the Navy, the Colour is dipped in the President's presence while marching past, and is recovered after passing the grandstand). If the parade marches past in slow time before the quick march segment the same pattern is observe with the sole exception of the Navy's colour which is also dipped in a slow time march.

With this portion being complete, the President or delegated reviewing officer will briefly address the regiment of which he/she presented the colours to, which will be concluded with the speaker expressing confidence in the unit, before that the unit commander makes his address of gratitude thanking the reviewing officer for their words and for their presence in the ceremony. After that, an Advance in Review Order is done, and one final National Salute is rendered. After the final salute, the battalion, together with the band and pipes and drums, marches off in quick time, and the colour guard squad marches off the field.

For Indian Armed Forces if the President is absent
In the absence of the President of India, the Vice President of India does not present colours to regiments, ships or air squadrons. The responsibility of being the guest of honour in his or her absence is prerogative of the Services Chiefs and as such, a General Salute is performed as the band plays appropriate music.

For federal and state police forces and organizations if the President is absent
When the president is absent, the federal Minister of Home Affairs or at times the Vice President or Prime Minister serves as delegate in any colour presentation ceremony to federal and/or state police forces. As such, a General Salute is performed by the parade assembled as the band plays appropriate music unless the National Anthem is played in the Vice President's presence.

Salutes are also given in a presentation ceremony to state governors who are acting on behalf of the President and in the name of their state governments.

President's Colours awarded to the State and UT Police Forces

Police commissionerates

State Armed Police Forces

President's Colours awarded to the Forces of various Ministries of the Government of India

Ministry of Railways
Railway Protection Force (RPF).  On 22 March 2006, the President of India A. P. J. Abdul Kalam awarded the President's Colours to the RPF, at New Delhi.
Ministry of Home Affairs (India)
Central Armed Police Forces
Central Reserve Police Force (CRPF).On 19 March 1950, Sardar Vallabhbhai Patel, the Home Minister of India presented the President's Colours to the CRPF. CRPF was the first CAPF which was awarded with the 'Colours'.
Rapid Action Force (RAF).  On 7 October 2003, L. K. Advani, the Deputy Prime Minister of India and the Home Minister of India presented the President's Colours to the RAF.
Sashastra Seema Bal (SSB).  On 27 March 2004, the President's Colours were awarded to the SSB by the Deputy Prime Minister Shri L.K. Advani .
Indo-Tibetan Border Police.  On June 20, 1987, Prime Minister Rajiv Gandhi presented the 'colors' to the ITBP.
Central Industrial Security Force (CISF). was raised on 10 March 1969 and CISF celebrates its raising day every year on 10 March. The Prime Minister P. V. Narsimha Rao also presented the 'Colours' to the CISF on 10 March 1994, at Ghaziabad.
Border Security Force. On March, 1984, The 'colours' was presented by the Home Minister Prakash Chandra Sethi to the BSF.
Assam Rifles. Assam Rifles was awarded with the 'COLOURS' by the Hon'ble President Giani Zail Singh on 29 Mar, 1985.
National Security Guards (NSG) (Special Forces of India).  On 16 October 2004, the President's Colours were awarded to the NSG by the President A. P. J. Abdul Kalam at New Delhi.
Sardar Vallabhbhai Patel National Police Academy (SVPNPA) On 15 September, 1988, SVPNPA was awarded with the President's Colours. 
Ministry of Defence
Interservice Institutions of Defence
Defence Services Staff College, Wellington, Tamil Nadu.  Defence Services Staff College was awarded on 9 September 2016, by the President Pranab Mukherjee.

President's Colours awarded to the Indian Armed Forces

Indian Coast Guard

 On 1 December 2002, the President of India A. P. J. Abdul Kalam awarded the prestigious President's Colours to the Indian Coast Guard, at the Indian Coast Guard Air Station Daman.

Indian Army

Infantry Regiments of the Indian Army
Madras Regiment.  
 Madras Regimental Centre with 15 Units of Madras Regiment were awarded on 23 May 1970, by the President V. V. Giri.
 27 Madras and 28 Madras were awarded on 23 September 1978, by the COAS Om Prakash Malhotra.
 11 Madras and 12 Madras on 19 May 1982, were awarded by the COAS Kotikalapudi Venkata Krishna Rao.
 10 Madras was awarded on 15 April 1988, by the COAS Krishnaswamy Sundarji.
 20 Madras Battalion and 21 Madras Battalion of Madras Regiment were awarded on 5 April 2015, at Wellington Military Station by General Dalbir Singh, Chief of Army Staff, on behalf of the President.
Punjab Regiment.  
 On 18 Mar 1969, Dr Zakir Husain, the President of India, presented the new colours to the Punjab Regiment at Meerut. 
 On 16 Feb 1985, Gen AS Vaidya, Chief of the Army Staff presented colours to the three Battalions of the Punjab Regiment. 
 The 28 Punjab Regiment was presented colours on 3 February 2004 at a ceremony at the Kila Hari Drill Square at the Punjab Regimental Centre, Ramgarh Cantt  by Gen NC Vij, Chief of the Army Staff.
 On 25 September 2019, Army Chief General Bipin Rawat presented the 'President's Colours' to 29th and 30th battalions of the Punjab Regiment, on the behalf of the President of India, at the Punjab Regimental Centre, Ramgarh, Jharkhand .
Bihar Regiment. 
 The first Colour presentation of the Regiment was held on 26 November 1970. G S Pathak, Vice President of India, during an impressive ceremonial parade presented new Colours to the centre and ten battalions.
 On 29 November 1991, 16 BIHAR and 17 BIHAR were Presented Colours by the Chief of the Army Staff General SF Rodrigues. 
 General Dalbir Singh, the Chief of the Army Staff, on 19 November 2016, presented the President's Colours to the 18th, 19th and 20th battalions of the Bihar Regiment at the Bihar Regimental Centre, Danapur.
 Kumaon Regiment. 
 4 Kumaon was the first battalion of the Indian Army to be presented with the 'Colours' on April 7, 1961, by the first President of India, Dr Rajendra Prasad. 
 On October 27, 1970, in a ceremony where old colours were laid down and the new 'Colours' were presented by the President Varahagiri Venkata Giri, at Ranikhet.
 Assam Regiment.  
 On 4 February 1976, President Fakhruddin Ali Ahmed presented new 'colours' to the Assam Regiment, at Jorhat.
 General Dalbir Singh, COAS presented the 'colours' to the 16 & 17 ASSAM on 16 November 2016, at ARC Shillong. 
 Arunachal Scouts. 
 General Dalbir Singh, COAS presented the 'colours' to the 1 & 2 Arunachal Scouts on 16 November 2016, at ARC Shillong.
Ladakh Scouts.  
Ladakh Scouts Regimental Centre and all five battalions of the Regiment were awarded on 27 August 2017, at Leh, Ladakh by President Ramnath Kovind.
Jat Regiment.  
 The First Indian Colours were presented to fourteen bns and the centre by President Dr Zakir Hussain on 23rd Nov 1967 at the Jat Regt Centre, Bareilly. This also holds the record for the maximum number of colours given to Units during one Colour presentation ceremony. 
 The Units those awarded - 1st Bn, 2nd Bn, 3rd Bn, 4th Bn, 5th Bn, 6th Bn, 7th Bn, 8th Bn, 9th Bn, 11th Bn, 14th Bn, 16th Bn, 17th Bn & 18th Bn. 
 The second set of Colours was presented to three more bns of the Regt by Chief of Army Staff Gen KV Krishna Rao, PVSM, ADC on 23 Nov 1983 at The Jat Regt Centre, Bareilly. 
 The Units those awarded - 12th Bn, 15th Bn & 19th Bn. 
 The third set of Colours was given to the Regt during the bicentenary celebrations by Chief of Army Staff Gen Shankar Roy Choudhury, PVSM, ADC on 20 Nov 1995 at The Jat Regt Centre, Bareilly, with this set of colour presentations all the eighteen regular bns had received the President's Colours. 
 The Units those awarded - 20th Bn & 21st Bn.  
 1 JAT (LI) which traces its history back to 1803 laid to rest its sixth colour (first after independence) given by President Dr Zakir Hussain on 23rd Nov 1967 at JRC and received its seventh colour as 2 Mech Inf (1 JAT LI) on 22nd Feb 1988 at Ahmednagar from President Dr R Venkatraman.
 Rajput Regiment. 
 On 17 November 1966, in a ceremony at Fatehgarh, Uttar Pradesh, old colours were laid down and the new 'colours' were awarded to the Rajput Regiment by then President Dr. S. Radhakrishnan.
 Dogra Regiment. 
 On 8 November 1968, the President Dr. Zakir Husain presented new 'colours' to all battalions of the Dogra Regiment, and old colours received on 15 February 1930 were laid to rest at the Dogra Regimental Centre, Meerut.
 On 24 November 1979, the COAS, General Om Prakash Malhotra presented the 'colours' to the 11th & 12th Battalion of the Dogra Regiment.
 On 18 February 1984, the COAS, General A S Vaidya presented the 'colours' to the 17th Dogra Battalion at Faizabad.
 On 3 March 1993, the COAS, General Sunith Francis Rodrigues presented the 'colours' to the 18th Dogra Battalion.
 On 22 February 2003, the COAS, General N C Vij presented the 'colours' to the 16th Battalion.
 On 24 March 2022, the COAS, General Manoj Mukund Naravane presented the 'colours' to the 20 DOGRA & 21 DOGRA battalions, at Faizabad, UP, in the presence of  Former COAS General (Retd.) NC Vij. 
Sikh Regiment.
 On 2 March 1968, the Sikh Regiment was awarded with new colours by then President Zakir Hussain, at Meerut.
Mahar Regiment. 
 On 3 February 1970, President V. V. Giri presented the new 'colours' to the Mahar Regiment, at Sagar.
 20 MAHAR and 21 MAHAR Battalions of the Mahar Regiment were awarded on 4 November 2016, at Saugor Military Station by General Dalbir Singh, Chief of Army Staff, on behalf of the President.
Naga Regiment.
 1 Naga was presented with the ‘Colours’ on 6 May 1978 at Dehradun by Shri Neelam Sanjiva Reddy, the President of India.
 2 Naga was presented with the ‘Colours’ on 10 May 1990 by Gen Vishwa Nath Sharma, the Chief of the Army Staff.
 Jammu and Kashmir Light Infantry.
 On 9 October 1998, the President K. R. Narayan presented the'colours'to the Jammu and Kashmir Light Infantry.
 On 4 November 2006, The COAS General J. J. Singh presented the President's 'colours' to the 17th battalion of the Jammu and Kashmir Light Infantry (JAKLI) Regiment.
Sikh Light Infantry.
The President of India, Dr Neelam Sanjeeva Reddy, presented the "Colours" to the 2 Sikh LI on 14 December 1981.
Maratha Light Infantry.
 In 1968, the new 'colours' were presented to the regiment by President Zakir Hussain. 
 In 1968, 9th Maratha LI was awarded with the President's Colours by the President Zakir Hussain and was received by Gen JJ Singh (later COAS).
 23 Maratha Light Infantry and 24 Maratha Light Infantry were presented the President's Colours at the Maratha Light Infantry Regimental Centre on 4 November 2017 by the COAS, General Bipin Rawat on behalf of the President Ramnath Kovind.
The Grenadiers. 
 On 19 December 1964, President Dr. S. Radhakrishnan presented new Regimental Colours to all battalions of the Grenadiers Regiment of the Indian Army at a ceremonial parade at the Regimental Centre at Nasirabad.
 On 10 December 2015, The COAS, General Dalbir Singh awarded the 'colours' to the 23 Grenadiers and the 24 Grenadiers, at Jabalpur.
Parachute Regiment (SF).   
 On 6 October 1967, President Zakir Hussain presented the new 'colours' to the Parachute Regiment, at Gwalior, MP.
 COAS General MM Naravane presented the ‘President’s Colours’ to four parachute battalions – 11 PARA (Special Forces), 21 PARA (Special Forces), 23 PARA and 29 PARA – at the Parachute Regiment Training Centre in Bengaluru on February 23, 2022.
Mechanised Regiments
Mechanised Infantry Regiment 
 The President Colours were awarded to the Regiment on 24 February 1988 at Mechanised Infantry Regimental Centre (MIRe), Ahmednagar, in a unique parade where 14 Colours were laid down and 24 Colours presented.
 2 Mech Inf (1 JAT LI) was awarded with colours on 22nd Feb 1988 at Ahmednagar from President Dr R Venkatraman. 
 Mech Inf was presented Colours on 04 Dec 1996 at Jodhpur by General Shankar Roy Chowdhary, PVSM, ADC, Chief of the Army Staff.
The Brigade of the Guards.
 4 Guards Mechanised (1 Rajput) was awarded with the President's Colours on its establishment on 1950.
 First Guards (2 Punjab) was presented with the Colors by President, Dr S. Radhakrishnan at Red Fort, New Delhi on September 26, 1962. Also, 1 GUARDS (2 PUNJAB) has the distinction of being the first and only battalion to receive Colours from the President in front of the Red Fort.
 The Centre and the 2nd to 14th battalions received Colours from the President at Kota on 16 Mar 1973 at a huge, colourful ceremony, one of the largest ever. 
 15 to 19 GUARDS were presented with colours by successive COAS at Kamptee.
Regiments of the Indian Army Armoured Corps
President's Bodyguard 
 Ist Silver Trumpet and Trumpet Banner. On May 14, 1957, Dr Rajendra Prasad, the first President of India, presented his Silver Trumpet and Trumpet Banner to the President's Bodyguard. 
 Dr. Prasad's personal standard was presented to the regiment on 18 Jan 1958 by the President himself, which was later abolished in 1971.
 In November, 1958, The President Dr. Rajendra Prasad presented a new Regimental Standard to the PBG, the previous Regimental Standard having been laid up after India became a republic. The old regimental standard rests in the Regiment's Officer's mess.
 2nd Silver Trumpet and Trumpet Banner. When the second President of India, Dr. Sarvepalli Radhakrishnan assumed the office, he presented his banner to the President's Bodyguard on 21 October 1962. 
 The new President's Standard and the Regimental Standard were awarded to the President's Bodyguard by the President Dr. S. Radhakrishnan on 11 November 1963.
 3rd Silver Trumpet and Trumpet Banner. The president had approved the presentation of the Silver Trumpet and Trumpet Banner but the ceremony could not be held due to his untimely demise. The trumpet and trumpet banner were later presented informally, with respect to the presidency of Dr. Zakir Husain (1967–69).
 4th Silver Trumpet and Trumpet Banner. President Varahagiri Venkata Giri presented the Silver Trumpet and Trumpet Banner to the President's Bodyguard at New Delhi.
 5th Silver Trumpet and Trumpet Banner. On 24 December 1978, President Dr. Neelam Sanjiva Reddy presented the Silver Trumpet and Trumpet Banner to the President's Bodyguard at New Delhi.
 6th Silver Trumpet and Trumpet Banner. On 6 October 1983, President Dr. Giani Zail Singh presented the Silver Trumpet and Trumpet Banner to the President's Bodyguard at New Delhi.
 7th Silver Trumpet and Trumpet Banner. On 24 October 1988, President Dr. Ramaswamy Venkataraman presented the Silver Trumpet and Trumpet Banner to the President's Bodyguard at New Delhi.
 8th Silver Trumpet and Trumpet Banner. On 18 October 1993, President Dr. Shankar Dayal Sharma presented the Silver Trumpet and Trumpet Banner to the President's Bodyguard at New Delhi.
 9th Silver Trumpet and Trumpet Banner. On 18 November 1998, the President Shri K. R. Narayan presented the Silver Trumpet and Trumpet Banner to the President's Bodyguard at the Rashtrapati Bhavan, New Delhi.
 10th Silver Trumpet and Trumpet Banner.  On 2 December 2005, The President of India Dr. A. P. J. Abdul Kalam presented the 10th Silver Trumpet and Trumpet Banner to the President's Bodyguard
 11th Silver Trumpet and Trumpet Banner.  On 2 March 2008, The President of India Smt. Pratibha Patil presented the Silver Trumpet and Trumpet Banner to the President's Bodyguard in an impressive ceremony held at the forecourt of the Rashtrapati Bhavan.
 12th Silver Trumpet and Trumpet Banner.  On 31 March 2013, The President of India Shri Pranab Mukherjee presented the Silver Trumpet and Trumpet Banner to the elite President's Bodyguard (PBG) in a colourful ceremony held at Rashtrapati Bhavan.
 13th Silver Trumpet and Trumpet Banner.  On November 17, 2017, The President of India, Shri Ram Nath Kovind, presented the Silver Trumpet and Trumpet Banner to the President's Bodyguard at a ceremony held at Rashtrapati Bhavan. 
 14th Silver Trumpet and Trumpet Banner. On 27 October, 2022, The President of India, Smt. Droupadi Murmu, presented the Silver Trumpet and Trumpet Banner to the PBG at a ceremony held at Rashtrapati Bhavan.
Indian Army Armoured Corps Centre and School. 

The Hon’ble President of India and Supreme Commander of the Armed Forces, Shri Pranab Mukherjee awarded the prestigious President’s Standards to Armoured Corps Centre and School, during a grand Ceremonial Parade held at Ahmednagar on 15 April 2017.

List of the other Regiments of Indian Army Armoured Corps awarded with the President's Colours/Standards/Guidons

Corps of the Indian Army
Army Medical Corps. 
 On 3 April 1966, Army Medical Corps were presented with the 'Colours' by the President Dr. S. Radhakrishnan.
Indian Army Corps of Signals.  
 On 15 February 2016, the President's Colour was awarded by the General Dalbir Singh, Chief of Army Staff, on behalf of the President to the Indian Army Corps of Signals, at Gauri Shankar Parade Ground, Jabalpur.
Corps of Army Air Defence.
 On 28 September 2019, the President's Colour was awarded to the Corps of Army Air Defence by the President Ramnath Kovind, at Gopalpur, Ganjam district, Odisha.
Army Aviation Corps.
 On 10 October 2019, the President's Colour was awarded by the President Ramnath Kovind to the Army Aviation Corps, at the Combat Army Aviation Training School, Nashik Road.
The Indian Army Corps of EME (Electronics and Mechanical Engineers)
 The President of India, Dr S. Radhakrishnan, presented the 'Colours' to the Corps on 15 October 1964 at 1 EME Centre during the 21st Anniversary celebrations.
 The Second Colours Presentation was presented at 3 EME Centre Bhopal on 15 October 1980. The Colours presented on behalf of the President by the General Om Prakash Malhotra, COAS. 
 The Third Colours presentation was presented on 23 November 2004. The old colours were put to rest and new colours were presented to the Corps at 1 EME Centre, Secunderabad by the General N C Vij, COAS on behalf of the President.
 The 4th Colours Presentation was presented at 3 EME Centre Bhopal. The Corps was honoured with colours on 18 February 2005, by the COAS, General J. J. Singh, on behalf of the President of India.
Army Ordnance Corps.  
 Army Ordnance Corps was awarded with the 'Colours' by the Vice President of India Shri Gopal Swarup Pathak on 8 December 1970, at AOC Centre Secunderabad.
Army Service Corps. 
 The new 'Colours' were presented by the President of India, Dr Zakir Husain to the Corps on 8 December 1967 on the 207th Corps Anniversary, at ASC Centre (South), Bangalore.
 The Second Regimental Colours were presented on the occasion of the Third Reunion by General Om Prakash Malhotra, COAS on 8 December 1979.
Indian Army Pioneer Corps. 
 The Pioneer Corps is the operational logistics arm of the Indian Army. The Chief of Army Staff General J. J. Singh presented the 'colours' to the Pioneer Corps Regiment at Bangalore, on 24 November 2006.
Indian Army Corps of Engineers. 
 Bengal Engineer Group / Bengal Sappers. 
On January 12, 1989, the 'President's Colour' was presented to the Bengal Engineer Group by the President R Venkataraman, at Roorkee.
 Bombay Engineer Group / Bombay Sappers.
On 21 February 1990, the Bombay Engineer Group was presented the "Colours" by his Excellency, the President of India Shri R Venkataraman.
 Madras Engineer Group / Madras Sappers. 
On 20 March 1990, the Madras Engineer Group was presented the "Colours" by his Excellency, the President of India Shri R Venkataraman. 
Indian Army Remount and Veterinary Corps.
The corps was awarded the Colours by the President of India on December 21, 1989, in recognition of its glorious contributions to Indian Army.
Army Education Corps (India).
 On 24 February 1971, President V. V. Giri presented the colours to the Army Educational Corps, at Pachmarhi.
Corps of Military Police (India).
 The President of India, Shri Neelam Sanjiva Reddy, presented ‘Colours’ to the Corps of Military Police on 24 April 1982. 
Training Establishments of the Indian Army
Indian Military Academy.  
 On 10 December 1962, on the 30th anniversary of the Academy's inauguration, the second President of India, Dr. Sarvapalli Radhakrishnan, presented new colours to the Indian Military Academy.
 On 15 Dec 1976, the fifth President of India, Shri Fakhruddin Ali Ahmed, presented new colours to IMA as a mark of appreciation of its services to the nation both in peace and war. 
Officers Training Academy. On August, 1990 OTA was awarded at Chennai by the President Shri R. Venkataraman.

Indian Air Force

Indian Air Force
 On 1 April 1954, the President's Colour was awarded to the IAF at Palam by the President Dr. Rajendra Prasad.
Air HQ Communication Squadron, Indian Air Force (Pegasus). Air HQ Communication Squadron was awarded with the President's Colours on 11 Dec 1984, at Palam.
Air Force Station 
List of President's Colour awarded to the Air Force Stations of the IAF

Aircraft Squadrons of the IAF
List of President's Colour awarded to the Squadrons of the IAF

Helicopter Units of the IAF
List of President's Colour awarded to the Helicopter Units of the IAF

Signal Units of IAF. 
List of President's Colour awarded to the Signal Units of the IAF

Base Repair Depot (BRD) of the IAF. 
List of President's Colour awarded to the Base Repair Depots of the IAF

Equipment Depot (ED). 
List of President's Colour awarded to the Equipment Depots of the IAF

Institutions of the IAF
List of President's Colour awarded to the Institutions of the IAF

Indian Navy

Indian Navy
The Indian Navy was the first branch of the Armed Forces which was rewarded with the President's Colours on 27 May 1951, by the President Dr. Rajendra Prasad. Since then every service command and ground installation of the Navy has been awarded the President's Colour of the Navy.

Naval Commands and Fleets
Southern Naval Command was awarded on 26 November 1984 by the  President Giani Zail Singh.
Eastern Naval Command was awarded on 25 March 1987 by the President Giani Zail Singh.
Western Naval Command was awarded on 22 February 1990 by the President Ramaswamy Venkataraman.
Western Fleet was awarded on 9 March 1997 by the President Dr. Shankar Dayal Sharma.
Eastern Fleet
Submarine Arm.  On 8 December 2017, the Submarine Arm of the Indian Navy was awarded by the President Ramnath Kovind.
Indian Naval Academy (INA), Ezhimala.  Indian Naval Academy (INA), Ezhimala was awarded on 20 November 2019 by the President Ramnath Kovind.
Indian Naval Stations
INS Shivaji.  INS Shivaji, Lonavala was awarded on 13 February 2020 by the President Ramnath Kovind.
INS Valsura
 INS Valsura, Jamnagar awarded with prestigious colours on 25 March, 2022 by the President Shri Ramnath Kovind.
Indian Naval Air Arm 
President Shri Ramnath Kovind awarded the President’s Colour to the Indian Naval Air Arm at the INS Hansa base near Panaji in Goa on 6 September 2021.
 Naval combatant squadrons of the Navy
22nd Missile Vessel Squadron
President of India Shri Ramnath Kovind presented the President’s Standard to the 22nd Missile Vessel Squadron, aka the Killers Squadron, at Naval Dockyard, Mumbai on 8 December 2021, the first naval combatant squadron to be presented with a standard in the Navy.

References

Military traditions
Military awards and decorations of India